San Patricio is a city in Nueces and San Patricio counties in the U.S. state of Texas. The population was 384 at the 2020 census.

Geography
According to the United States Census Bureau, San Patricio, located at  (27.959196, -97.773134), has a total area of 3.9 square miles (10.0 km), of which 3.8 square miles (9.9 km) is land and 0.04 square mile (0.1 km) (1.03%) is water.

History
The town was founded in 1829 by empresarios James McGloin and John McMullen. They had received approval from the Mexican government to settle 200 Irish Catholic families on the land—the name meaning Saint Patrick, the patron saint of Ireland. Empresario James Power was involved as well.

The Battle of San Patricio was fought near the town in 1836 during the Texas Revolution.

With the approval of the General Council, Texas revolutionaries James Grant, Frank W. Johnson and Robert C. Morris collaborated on plans to lead an assault on the Mexican town of Matamoros. Recruiting some 300 men, several of whom were native to San Antonio, they gathered provisions from the Alamo and Presidio La Bahia for their expedition. The men needed mounts for their long journey and divided into groups as they traveled toward the coast to capture wild horses.

On February 27, 1836, Mexican General José de Urrea's advanced reconnaissance patrol discovered Frank W. Johnson and about 34 Texians camped at the abandoned Irish settlement of San Patricio. In a surprise attack at 3:30am, Mexican troops fired on the Texian Army and killed about 10 (7 of them Hispanics) and captured 18. Johnson and four others who were captured managed to escape and rejoin James Fannin's command at Goliad. One man, Daniel J. Toler, escaped capture. The men killed were buried in the Old Cemetery on the Hill in San Patricio.

Grant and Morris's party was also surprised by Urrea's army as they camped at Agua Dulce Creek. On March 2, the Mexicans surprised them, killing both Grant and Morris and twelve others. The survivors were taken captured and imprisoned at Matamoros.

In 1846, San Patricio became the second county seat of San Patricio County after Nueces County was partitioned from San Patricio County. In 1893, the county seat was moved to Sinton.

Demographics

2020 census

As of the 2020 United States census, there were 384 people, 155 households, and 116 families residing in the city.

2000 census
As of the census of 2000, there were 318 people, 113 households, and 89 families residing in the city. The population density was 82.7 people per square mile (32.0/km). There were 124 housing units at an average density of 32.3/sq mi (12.5/km). The racial makeup of the city was 81.45% White, 0.94% African American, 0.63% Native American, 14.47% from other races, and 2.52% from two or more races. Hispanic or Latino of any race were 39.94% of the population.

There were 113 households, out of which 42.5% had children under the age of 18 living with them, 64.6% were married couples living together, 8.8% had a female householder with no husband present, and 21.2% were non-families. 18.6% of all households were made up of individuals, and 8.8% had someone living alone who was 65 years of age or older. The average household size was 2.81 and the average family size was 3.22.

The population in the city was spread out, with 33.0% under the age of 18, 4.4% from 18 to 24, 33.3% from 25 to 44, 19.8% from 45 to 64, and 9.4% who were 65 years of age or older; the median age was 36 years. For every 100 females, there were 102.5 males. For every 100 females age 18 and over, there were 91.9 males.

The median income for a household in the city was $32,386, and the median income for a family was $40,313. Males had a median income of $31,250 versus $19,063 for females. The per capita income for the city was $13,531. About 12.6% of families and 14.9% of the population were below the poverty line, including 17.9% of those under age 18 and 14.7% of those age 65 or over.

Education
The City of San Patricio is served by the Mathis Independent School District.

References

Cities in Nueces County, Texas
Cities in San Patricio County, Texas
Cities in Texas
Cities in the Corpus Christi metropolitan area
Irish-American history and culture in Texas
Former county seats in Texas
1829 establishments in Mexico
Irish emigrants to Mexico